The North 23rd Street Bridge in Tacoma, Washington, United States, is a concrete rigid frame bridge that was designed by engineers Waddell & Harrington in 1909.  It was built for the City of Tacoma by contractors Creelman, Putman, and Healy.

It is significant as an early concrete rigid frame bridge. It has "massive, overdesigned concrete beams" that are "6 feet wide at the center, and 13 feet at the ends". The beams are "8 feet deep at the center, and 12 feet deep at the ends."

It was listed on the National Register of Historic Places in 1982.

See also
North 21st Street Bridge, shorter but wider and using continuous beams, also designed by Waddell & Harrington and also NRHP-listed

References

Road bridges on the National Register of Historic Places in Washington (state)
Bridges in Tacoma, Washington
National Register of Historic Places in Tacoma, Washington
Concrete bridges in the United States